Horace Richard Crane (November 4, 1907 – April 19, 2007) was an American physicist, the inventor of the Race Track Synchrotron, a recipient of President Ronald Reagan's National Medal of Science "for the first measurement of the magnetic moment and spin of free electrons and positrons".
He was also noted for proving the existence of neutrinos. The National Academy of Sciences called Crane "an extraordinary physicist". The University of Michigan called him "one of the most distinguished experimental physicists of the 20th century". Crane was a chairman of the department of physics
 and a professor of physics at the University of Michigan, a member of the National Academy of Sciences.

Crane earned his Ph.D. in 1934 under Charles Lauritsen at Caltech. During World War II, he worked on radar at MIT and proximity fuses at the Carnegie Institution of Washington and the University of Michigan. He consulted for the National Defense Research Commission and the Office of Scientific Research and Development.

From 1957 to 1960, Crane was president of the Midwestern Universities Research Association. In addition, he was president of the American Association of Physics Teachers in 1965, and on the board of governors of the American Institute of Physics from 1964 to 1975.

Crane was a supporter of higher education all his life. He and his wife donated money and time to Washtenaw Community College, in Ann Arbor Township, Michigan, with a building being named after them. Their effort was to encourage making higher education accessible to all the residents in the county, and their efforts are documented on the campus itself.

Life and career 
 1907: Born in Turlock, California on November 4
 1930: BS, California Institute of Technology
 1934: PhD in Physics, California Institute of Technology
 1934–1935: California Institute of Technology, Research Fellow in Physics
 1935–1938: University of Michigan, Instructor and Research Physicist
 1938–1946: University of Michigan, Assistant Professor to Associate Professor of Physics
 1946–1978: University of Michigan, Professor of Physics
 1978–2007: University of Michigan, Emeritus Professor of Physics

References

External links 

 Oral history interview transcript with H. Richard Crane on 28 March 1973, American Institute of Physics, Niels Bohr Library & Archives - Session I
 Oral history interview transcript with H. Richard Crane on 18 June 1974, American Institute of Physics, Niels Bohr Library & Archives - Session II
 Oral history interview transcript with H. Richard Crane on 29 June 1990, American Institute of Physics, Niels Bohr Library & Archives

1907 births
2007 deaths
People from Turlock, California
20th-century American physicists
California Institute of Technology faculty
University of Michigan faculty
California Institute of Technology alumni
Members of the United States National Academy of Sciences
Fellows of the American Physical Society